The 1967–68 season was the 66th season in which Dundee competed at a Scottish national level, playing in Division One, where the club would finish in 9th place. Domestically, Dundee would also compete in both the Scottish League Cup and the Scottish Cup, where they would reach the League Cup Final before being defeated by Celtic, and by Rangers in a 2nd round replay in the Scottish Cup. Dundee would also compete in the Inter-Cities Fairs Cup, the precursor to the UEFA Cup and currently the UEFA Europa League, where they would reach the semi-finals before being defeated by eventual champions, Don Revie's Leeds United.

Scottish Division One 

Statistics provided by Dee Archive.

League table

Scottish League Cup 

Statistics provided by Dee Archive.

Group 3

Group 3 table

Knockout stage

Scottish Cup 

Statistics provided by Dee Archive.

Inter-Cities Fairs Cup 

Statistics provided by Dee Archive.

Player statistics 
Statistics provided by Dee Archive

|}

See also 

 List of Dundee F.C. seasons

References

External links 

 1967-68 Dundee season on Fitbastats

Dundee F.C. seasons
Dundee